Rayshade is a software application for ray tracing (3D rendering) from a text 3D model description input file into a finished, realistic image.

The first version was written between 1987 and 1988 at Princeton University. It is written by Craig E. Kolb in C, yacc, and lex. It runs on many different Unix platforms, and was also later ported to the DOS operating system. It does not have a graphical user interface.

Screenshots

Example code 
 /* Just a ball */
 sphere
 surface  ambient .05 .05 .05  diffuse .5 .5 .5 specular .5 .5 .5  specpow 60 reflect .2
 1. 0 0 0
 /* Scene setup */
 eyep 1.7 -3.15 2.6
 lookup 0. 0. 0.
 up 0. 0. 1.
 light 0.4 0.4 0.4  directional 1. 0. 1.
 background  1. 1. 1.

External links
 Rayshade Homepage at Stanford 
 Rayshade 4 on GitHub
 rayshade-math: converts Mathematica graphics (complex math drawings) to shaded Rayshade scenes scripts to raytrace

Ray tracing (graphics)